Andy Hendel (born March 4, 1961) is a former American football linebacker. He played for the Jacksonville Bulls in 1984 and for the Miami Dolphins in 1986.

References

1961 births
Living people
American football linebackers
NC State Wolfpack football players
Jacksonville Bulls players
Miami Dolphins players